Sattur is a taluk of Virudhunagar district of the Indian state of Tamil Nadu. The headquarters of the taluk is the town of Sattur.

Demographics
According to the 2011 census, the taluk of Sattur had a population of 168,659 with 83,113 males and 85,546 females. There were 1,029 women for every 1,000 men. The taluk had a literacy rate of 71.41%. Child population in the age group below 6 years were 8,145 Males and 7,787 Females.

References 

Taluks of Virudhunagar district